Dix Holt McMullin (November 30, 1933 – November 8, 2008), was an American politician who was a Republican member of the Utah House of Representatives and Utah State Senate. McMullin was an alumnus of the University of Utah, holding a Bachelor of Science, Master of Science and doctor of philosophy (Ph.D.) degrees. He was an educator. He died of cancer in 2008. McMullin was those involved in the early consultations that lead to the formation of the Utah Boys Ranch.

References

1933 births
2008 deaths
Republican Party members of the Utah House of Representatives
Republican Party Utah state senators
People from South Jordan, Utah
University of Utah alumni
Deaths from cancer in Utah
20th-century American politicians